"Take My Hand" is a song written by Dido Armstrong and Richard Dekkard and is the closing track on Dido's multi-million selling 1999 album No Angel. The song begins in a strong and brooding mood and builds to a crescendo of strings and guitar at the end. The same version was first released on her collection of demos in 1995. It reached number one on the Dance charts in the U.S. in 2002, seven years later.

Charts

Jurgen Vries version

In June 2004, the song was covered by DJ Darren Tate under his Jurgen Vries guise and it reached #23 in the UK Singles Chart. The vocals on this track were performed by Andrea Britton. This version contained mostly electronic instruments and had a more upbeat tempo throughout, turning it into a more formulaic sound conforming to a contemporary style.

Track listing

See also
 List of number-one dance singles of 2002 (U.S.)

References

1995 songs
2004 singles
Dido (singer) songs
Darren Tate songs
Songs written by Dido (singer)
Song recordings produced by Dido (singer)
Song recordings produced by Rollo Armstrong
Song recordings produced by Sister Bliss